Toussaint-Antoine-Rodolphe Laflamme,  (15 May 1827 – 7 December 1893), was a French-Canadian lawyer, professor of law and politician. He received a BCL in 1856 and an honorary DCL in 1873, both from McGill University. He was a partner in a prominent Montreal, Quebec law firm, and was known for his support of the Liberal party.  He was from 1872 to 1878 a Member of Parliament in the House of Commons of Canada, and served as the Minister of Inland Revenue, and then the Minister of Justice in the administration of Alexander Mackenzie.

Family
His daughter Lady Jetté, married, in 1862, Sir Louis-Amable Jetté, K.C.M.G., a Justice of the Superior Court of Quebec, and Lieutenant-Governor of Quebec. She was born March 27, 1841 and educated in Montreal.

By-election: On Mr. Laflamme being named Minister of Inland Revenue, 9 November 1876

References 

 
 

1827 births
1893 deaths
Academics from Montreal
Lawyers from Montreal
Canadian legal scholars
Liberal Party of Canada MPs
Members of the House of Commons of Canada from Quebec
Members of the King's Privy Council for Canada
McGill University Faculty of Law alumni
Politicians from Montreal